"Big Decisions" is a song by American rock band My Morning Jacket for its seventh studio album, The Waterfall (2015). It was released as the lead single from the record on March 2, 2015.

It represents the group's highest peak on the Adult Alternative Songs chart in the U.S., where it reached number seven.

Background
"Big Decisions" is about people refraining to change things in their lives that make them unhappy. It was co-written by frontman Jim James and musician Dan Wilson. The band re-recorded the song in their hometown of Louisville.

Formats and track listings

Charts

Weekly charts

References

External links
 

2015 singles
2014 songs
My Morning Jacket songs
Songs written by Dan Wilson (musician)
Capitol Records singles
Songs written by Jim James
Song recordings produced by Tucker Martine
ATO Records singles